This article contains the list of candidates associated with the 1991 Russian presidential election.

Registered candidates

Candidates that failed to register
Boris Gromov -military veteran; ended his campaign and was instead registered as Ryzhkov's (who was nominated by the Communist Party of the Soviet Union) vice-presidential candidate
Roman Kalinin -co-head of the Moscow Gay & Lesbian Alliance 
V. Potemkin (nominated by League of Independent Scientists of the RSFSR)
Aleksei Alekseyevich Sergeyev (nominated by Communists of Russia and the Initiative Congress of Russian Communists) -ended his campaign and was instead registered as Makashov's vice-presidential candidate
Lev Ubozhko
Vladimir Voronin -Minister of Internal Affairs (1988-1990)

Possible candidates who did not run
Ivan Polozkov -head of the Communist Party of the Russian Soviet Federative Socialist Republic

References

 
1991
1991 Russian presidential election